Attack of the Awesome!!! is an EP by American rock band Patent Pending, released in 2009. It features other artists such as Jeremy Carr. The album spawned one music video for the song "Drop Dead", which parodied the TV show Jersey Shore.

Track listing
 Anti-Everything feat. Jeremy Carr
 Air Underneath My Feet feat. Pat Brown
 The Way You Make Me Shake
 Dear Stacy I Hate You
 Drop Dead
 Sunset Summer
 Hey Six
 Therefore, I Party

Reviews 
The songs "Anti-Everything" and "The Way You Make Me Shake" are favorites among fans and are often played at concerts.

Punk rock EPs
EPs by American artists
2009 EPs
Patent Pending (band) albums